Wednesday is the day of the week between Tuesday and Thursday.  According to international standard ISO 8601, it is the third day of the week. In countries which have Friday as their holiday, Wednesday is the fifth day of the week. In countries which use the Sunday-first convention, and in both the Islamic and Jewish calendars, Wednesday is the fourth day of the week.

In English, the name is derived from Old English  and Middle English , 'day of Woden', reflecting the religion practiced by the Anglo-Saxons, the English equivalent to the Norse god Odin. In many Romance languages, such as the French , Spanish  or Italian , the day's name is a calque of Latin  'day of Mercury'.

Wednesday is in the middle of the common Western five-day workweek that starts on Monday and finishes on Friday.

Etymology
See Names of the days of the week for more on naming conventions.
The name Wednesday continues Middle English . Old English still had , which would be continued as *Wodnesday  (but Old Frisian has an attested ).
By the early 13th century, the i-mutated form was introduced unetymologically.

The name is a calque of the Latin  'day of Mercury', reflecting the fact that the Germanic god Woden (Wodanaz or Odin) during the Roman era was interpreted as "Germanic Mercury".

The Latin name dates to the late 2nd or early 3rd century. It is a calque of Greek , a term first attested, together with the system of naming the seven weekdays after the seven classical planets, in the Anthologiarum by Vettius Valens (c. AD 170).

The Dutch name for the day, has the same etymology as English Wednesday; it comes from Middle Dutch ,  ('Wodan's day').

The German name for the day,  (literally: 'mid-week'), replaced the former name  ('Wodan's day') in the 10th century.

Some dialects of Faroese have , though, which shares etymology with Wednesday. Danish, Norwegian, Swedish , ( meaning 'Odin's day').

In Japanese, the word for Wednesday is  meaning 'water day' and is associated with : Mercury (the planet), literally meaning 'water star'.

In most of the languages of India, the word for Wednesday is  —  meaning 'day' and Budha being the planet Mercury.

In Armenian, Georgian, Turkish, and Tajik languages the word literally means 'four (days) from Saturday' originating from Persian.

Portuguese uses the word , meaning 'fourth day', while in Greek the word is  meaning simply 'fourth'. Similarly, Arabic  means 'fourth', Hebrew  means 'fourth', and Persian  means 'fourth day'. Yet the name for the day in Estonian , Lithuanian , and Latvian  means 'third day' while in Mandarin Chinese , means 'day three', as Sunday is unnumbered.

Religious observances

The Creation narrative in the Hebrew Bible places the creation of the Sun and Moon on "the fourth day" of the divine workweek.

Quakers traditionally referred to Wednesday as "Fourth Day" to avoid the pagan associations with the name "Wednesday", or in keeping with the practice of treating each day as equally divine.

The Eastern Orthodox Church observes Wednesday (as well as Friday) as a fast day throughout the year (with the exception of several fast-free periods during the year). Fasting on Wednesday and Fridays entails abstinence from meat or meat products (i.e., four-footed animals), poultry and dairy products. Unless a feast day occurs on a Wednesday, the Orthodox also abstain from fish, from using oil in their cooking and from alcoholic beverages (there is some debate over whether abstention from oil involves all cooking oil or only olive oil). For the Orthodox, Wednesdays and Fridays throughout the year commemorate the betrayal of Jesus (Wednesday) and the Crucifixion of Christ (Friday). There are hymns in the Octoekhos which reflect this liturgically.  These include special Theotokia (hymns to the Mother of God) called  ('Cross-Theotokia'). The dismissal at the end of services on Wednesday begins with these words: "May Christ our true God, through the power of the precious and life-giving cross...."

In American culture many Catholic and Protestant churches schedule study or prayer meetings on Wednesday nights. The sports calendar in many American public schools reflects this, reserving Mondays and Thursdays for girls' games and Tuesdays and Fridays for boys' games while generally avoiding events on Wednesday evening.

In the Catholic devotion of the Holy Rosary, the glorious mysteries are meditated on Wednesday and also Sunday throughout the year.

Wednesday is the day of the week devoted by the Catholic tradition to Saint Joseph.

Cultural usage
In Hindu mythology, Budha is the god of Mercury (planet), mid-week Wednesday, and of Merchants and merchandise.  According to the Thai solar calendar, the color given with Wednesday is green.

In the folk rhyme Monday's Child, "Wednesday's child is full of woe". In the rhyme Solomon Grundy, Grundy was "married on Wednesday". In Winnie the Pooh and the Blustery Day, the disagreeable nature of the weather is attributed to it being "Winds-Day" (a play on Wednesday). In Richard Brautigan's In Watermelon Sugar Wednesday is the day when the sun shines grey. Wednesday Friday Addams is a member of the fictional family The Addams Family. Her name is derived from the idea that Wednesday's child is full of woe. Additionally, Wednesday sometimes appears as a character's name in literary works. These include Thursday's fictions by Richard James Allen, Wednesday Next from the Thursday Next series by Jasper Fforde and Neil Gaiman's novel American Gods. In the 1945 John Steinbeck novel Sweet Thursday, the titular day is preceded by "Lousy Wednesday".

Wednesday is sometimes informally referred to as "hump day" in North America, a reference to the fact that Wednesday is the middle day—or "hump"—of a typical work week.  Lillördag, or "little Saturday", is a Nordic tradition of turning Wednesday evening into a small weekend-like celebration. Humpday is also a name of a 2009 film.

In Poland Wednesday night is often referred by young people as "time of vodka", after song by Bartosz Walaszek "Środowa noc to wódy czas"

Astrology
The astrological sign of the planet Mercury, ☿, represents Wednesday— to the Romans, it had similar names in Latin-derived languages, such as the Italian  ( means 'day'), the French , and the Spanish . In English, this became "Woden's Day", since the Roman god Mercury was identified by Woden in Northern Europe and it is especially aligned by the astrological signs of Gemini and Virgo.

Named days
 Ash Wednesday, the first day of Lent in the Western Christian tradition, occurs forty-six days before Easter (forty, not counting Sundays).
 Black Wednesday, the day of a financial crisis in the United Kingdom
 Holy Wednesday, sometimes called Spy Wednesday in allusion to the betrayal of Jesus by Judas Iscariot, is the Wednesday immediately preceding Easter. 
 Red Wednesday, the Yezidi festival celebrated in Iraq.

References

External links 
 
 
 

 
3 Wednesday
Fasting
Hermes